Jānis Krūmiņš (30 January 1930 – 20 November 1994) was a Soviet-Latvian professional basketball player. Helped by his height (about 220 cm, or 7'3"), he was the first giant center that dominated under European baskets, for years. As a player of the senior Soviet Union national basketball team, Krūmiņš won 3 gold medals at the 1959, 1961, and 1963 EuroBaskets, as well as 3 silver medals at the 1956, 1960, and 1964 Summer Olympic Games.

A Russian poll that was conducted in 2006, named Krūmiņš as the 3rd most popular Soviet men's basketball player of all time, after Arvydas Sabonis and Vladimir Tkachenko.

Early life and career
Jānis Krūmiņš was born on 30 January 1930, in Raiskums Parish, Cēsis District, Latvia. His father was a big strong man, who died when Jānis was still a boy. At the age of 13, Krūmiņš had to start working, as a collector of tree resin. Very soon, he became an efficient worker, partly because his height (he was 2 meters (6'7") tall by the age 14) allowed him to reach where others failed. He liked his work, and later was hesitant to turn into a professional basketball player, saying that he could always get injured and lose his job as a basketball player, but not as a resin collector. As a well-built giant, Krūmiņš attracted the attention of many sports coaches, who tried to get him into wrestling, boxing, and athletics. Famous Soviet athletics coach Viktor Alexeyev even brought him in for a month to an athletics training camp. All of those attempts failed, because of a lack of interest from Krūmiņš.

In 1953, Krūmiņš was discovered by head basketball coach Alexander Gomelsky, and he was brought to the basketball club Rīgas ASK. Gomelsky was struggling to make ASK the top Latvian basketball club of the time, and he needed a strong player at the center position. Although Krūmiņš had never played basketball before, Gomelsky intuitively believed in his potential, and spent up to 2 hours personally training Krūmiņš before each of the team's training sessions. Gomelsky considered Krūmiņš to be his only apprentice in his whole basketball career — all the other players that he coached were well-established before he had coached them. Physically, Krūmiņš had good coordination and extraordinary strength, but he was slow. His height was exceptional for that time, and was variably reported between 2.18 m (7'2") and 2.23 m (7'4"). The variation was mostly due to his body's natural contraction during the day, and over the length of his playing career. With a weight of 141 kg (312 pounds), he was described as, "well built and dry". He was not a talented pupil, but he was exceptionally persistent, and performed all the drills that were set by his coach. His strongest point, according to Gomelsky, was his mental balance and reliability. On the other hand, he was too shy for a team leader. Seeing a 2.20 m (7'3") giant, most defenders did not hesitate to step on his toes, or to push or punch him. Krūmiņš patiently took all abuses, and when once asked why he didn't fight back, replied that he was afraid he might accidentally kill someone. Later, when Krūmiņš became a star, his modesty brought another problem — he was instantly recognized by people on the streets, and cheered and touched by the crowds, which made him feel uncomfortable. As a result of that, he stopped using public transportation, and drove a car instead.

Another mundane daily problem was his height, which hindered his ability to find clothes and shoes that fit properly. Luckily, Krūmiņš was spotted by Soviet Marshal Hovhannes Bagramyan. Bagramyan, who was a big man himself, was favorable to tall sportsmen, and after meeting Krūmiņš, he ordered a 3-meter-long (9'10") bed to be custom built for Krūmiņš, as well as for custom shoes and clothes to be made for him.

Club career
All of the long and intense training efforts of Krūmiņš and Gomelsky paid off. Krūmiņš quickly developed into a smart center and a team leader of Rīgas ASK. He won the USSR Premier League championship in 1955, 1956 (with the Latvian SSR Team), 1957, and 1958. He also won the FIBA European Champions Cup (EuroLeague) championship in 1958, 1959, and 1960. He also played in the EuroLeague Finals in 1961. Krūmiņš finished his club career playing with VEF Rīga.

Krūmiņš remained a laid back player over all of those years, as he continued to spare smaller and weaker opponents from his best. However, he was quite emotional and active in the key games that his teams played, and he played with full effort against players that were similar to him in size. Krūmiņš had a rare free throw shooting style — as he shot free throws underhanded, rather than the usual overhanded free throw technique. However, he was still able to make 90% of his free throw attempts on average.

National team career
Krūmiņš was included into the senior USSR national basketball team in 1955. He was a dominant center for the Soviet Union at the 1956 Summer Olympics, and he helped the Soviet national team to reach the tournament's finals, and earn a silver medal. He played with the senior Soviet national team for about 10 years, and with them he won EuroBasket gold medals in 1959, 1961, and 1963; and Summer Olympic Games silver medals in 1956, 1960, and 1964. He also played at the 1959 FIBA World Championship.

Personal life
Krūmiņš was shy around people, including women. He met his wife, Inessa, by chance. In 1960, while she was working as a sculptor, she was ordered to make a bust of Krūmiņš, on the occasion of the 20th anniversary of the Latvian Soviet Socialist Republic. The couple had two sons, and a daughter. After retiring from playing basketball, Krūmiņš worked within his family business, and became a renowned metalworker, molding metal art from sketches done by his wife. Krūmiņš died on 20 November 1994, at the age of 64.

References

External links

FIBA Profile 1
FIBA Profile 2
Photo: Krūmiņš (left) vs. Jean-Claude Lefebvre 

1930 births
1994 deaths
ASK Riga players
Basketball players at the 1956 Summer Olympics
Basketball players at the 1960 Summer Olympics
Basketball players at the 1964 Summer Olympics
BK VEF Rīga players
Centers (basketball)
FIBA EuroBasket-winning players
Latvian men's basketball players
Medalists at the 1956 Summer Olympics
Medalists at the 1960 Summer Olympics
Medalists at the 1964 Summer Olympics
Olympic basketball players of the Soviet Union
Olympic medalists in basketball
Olympic silver medalists for the Soviet Union
People from Pārgauja Municipality
Soviet men's basketball players
1959 FIBA World Championship players